Edisto Island Presbyterian Church is a historic Presbyterian church on Edisto Island, South Carolina.

The congregation was founded in 1685 and the current church building was constructed in 1831. The church's burying ground is adjacent to the building.  The church was added to the National Register of Historic Places on June 24, 1971. The congregation is a member of the Presbyterian Church (USA).

References

External links

Official Website

Historic American Buildings Survey in South Carolina
Presbyterian churches in South Carolina
Churches on the National Register of Historic Places in South Carolina
Churches completed in 1831
19th-century Presbyterian church buildings in the United States
Churches in Charleston County, South Carolina
National Register of Historic Places in Charleston County, South Carolina